Uher may refer to:
 Uher (village), a village in Poland
 Uher (brand), a German brand of electronic equipment

People
Karel Uher (born 1983), Czech curler
Rudolf Uher, Canadian psychiatrist
Štefan Uher (1930–1993), Slovak film director